The 2019 FIS Ski Jumping Grand Prix was the 26th Summer Grand Prix season in ski jumping for men and the 8th for ladies.

Other competitive circuits this season included the World Cup, Continental Cup, FIS Cup, FIS Race and Alpen Cup.

Calendar

Men

Ladies

Men's team

Mixed team

Men's standings

Overall

Nations Cup

Prize money

Ladies' standings

Overall

Nations Cup

Prize money

References 

Grand Prix
FIS Grand Prix Ski Jumping